Christian Bauer (born 11 January 1977) is a French chess grandmaster and author. He is a three-time French Chess Champion (1996, 2012, 2015).

In 2005 he won the 2nd Calvia Chess Festival. In 2009, came first at Vicente Bonil ahead of 21 GMs and 33 titled players.  In 2010, he tied for 1st–7th with Alexander Riazantsev, Vitali Golod, Nadezhda Kosintseva, Leonid Kritz, Sébastien Feller, Sébastien Mazé in the 43rd Biel Chess Festival.

Books

References

External links

1977 births
Living people
People from Forbach
Chess grandmasters
French chess players
French chess writers
French male non-fiction writers
Sportspeople from Moselle (department)